Karnes City is a city in and county seat of  Karnes County, Texas, United States. The population was 3,111 at the 2020 census, up from 3,042 at the 2010 census. The town was named after Henry Karnes of the Texas Revolution.

History 
In 1894, as a result of a special election, the county seat was moved from Helena to Karnes City. Ten years earlier, Colonel William G. Butler (1831–1912) had blamed Helena and its corrupt mayor for the death of his son, Emmett, who was killed on December 26, 1884, by a stray bullet from a bar fight. Butler, a wealthy rancher, retaliated by arranging for the San Antonio and Aransas Pass Railway, which started construction in 1885, to bypass Helena.

The railway started operation in 1886. By 1890, with no rail line, Helena was at a disadvantage for serving the county's needs. The new town, named for Colonel Henry Wax Karnes (1812–1840), veteran of the Texas Revolution and a leader of the Texas Rangers, was a viable settlement by 1894, when the county voted to move its seat from Helena. Karnes City continued to grow, while Helena faded into a ghost town.

The story was fictionalized in the 1969 episode "The Oldest Law" of the television series Death Valley Days. In the episode, Jim Davis played the role of Colonel Butler, while Stacy Harris played Helena's mayor.

Geography

Karnes City is located in central Karnes County at  (28.8882, –97.9013).

U.S. 181 runs through the southwest side of Karnes City, leading northwest  to San Antonio and south  to Beeville. Texas State Highway 123 runs north from Karnes City  to Stockdale, and State Highway 80 leads northeast  to Gillett.

Demographics

As of the 2020 United States census, there were 3,111 people, 657 households, and 486 families residing in the city.

As of the census of 2000, there were 3,457 people, 1,007 households, and 720 families living in the city. The population density was 1,627.6 people per square mile (629.6/km2). There were 1,180 housing units at an average density of 555.6 per square mile (214.9/km2).

There were 1,007 households, out of which 35.8% had children under the age of 18 living with them, 46.7% were married couples living together, 19.3% had a female householder with no husband present, and 28.5% were non-families. 25.2% of all households were made up of individuals, and 14.8% had someone living alone who was 65 years of age or older. The average household size was 2.81 and the average family size was 3.37.

In the city, the population was spread out, with 25.9% under the age of 18, 11.5% from 18 to 24, 31.1% from 25 to 44, 16.6% from 45 to 64, and 14.9% who were 65 years of age or older. The median age was 33 years. For every 100 females, there were 122.7 males. For every 100 females age 18 and over, there were 130.6 males.

The median income for a household in the city was $25,156, and the median income for a family was $27,206. Males had a median income of $30,446 versus $18,261 for females. The per capita income for the city was $12,243. About 23.1% of families and 27.0% of the population were below the poverty line, including 36.6% of those under age 18 and 22.6% of those age 65 or over.

Education
Karnes City is served by the Karnes City Independent School District: Karnes City Primary, Roger E. Sides Elementary School, Karnes City Junior High School, and Karnes City High School.

Climate
The climate in this area is characterized by hot, humid summers and generally mild to cool winters.  According to the Köppen climate classification system, Karnes City has a humid subtropical climate, Cfa on climate maps.

Notable people

 Maria Moreno, farmworker and labor organizer

References

External links
Official website

Cities in Texas
Cities in Karnes County, Texas
County seats in Texas